Seyyed Mohammad Reza Saeedi (Persian: سید محمدرضا سعیدی) (born: 1929, Mashhad) was an Iranian Twelver Shia cleric; who was among the (known) revolutionary companions of Iran's previous/first supreme leader, Seyyed Ruhollah Khomeini; and eventually was killed due to the tortures of SAVAK (of the Shah) at the age of 41.

He is the father of Seyyed Mohammad Saeedi, the Imam of Friday Prayer (of Qom), and likewise Seyyed Ahmad Khatami, Tehran's Imam of Friday.

Family 

(Seyyed) Mohammad Reza Saeedi was the son of Seyyed Ahmad (Saeedi), and his wife was from the family of Mirza Shirazi.

Seyyed Mohammad Reza is also the father of Seyyed Mohammad Saeedi who is currently the trusteeship of Fatima Masumeh Shrine, and is likewise Qom Imam of Friday Prayer and the representative of Guardianship of the Islamic Jurist of Qom.

Seyyed Ahmad Khatami, the (temporary) Imam of Friday Prayer --of Tehran-- is the son-in-law of Seyyed Mohammad Reza Saeedi.

Teachers 
Seyyed Mohammad Reza Saeedi studied his elementary lesson beside his father; and passed his seminary lessons (of Moqaddamat/Sath) by many teachers, among them are: Adib Neishaboori, (Sheikh) Hashem Qazvini, Mojtaba Qazvini and Kazem Damghani. Meanwhile, he was present at the classes of Seyyed Ruhollah Khomeini and Seyyed Hossein Borujerdi, too.

See also 
 Iranian Revolution (1979)
 Seyyed Mohammad Saeedi
 Ahmad Khatami

References 

People from Mashhad
Iranian ayatollahs
1929 births
Iranian people who died in prison custody
1970 deaths